This is a list of past and present programs airing on Food Network Canada.  It includes original programming, programming from Food Network, and programming acquired from other networks around the world.

Current

#-0

A-E
Amy Schumer Learns to Cook
The Baker Sisters
Beat Bobby Flay
Barefoot Contessa
Brunch at Bobby's
Burgers, Brew & 'Que
Cake Hunters
Cake Wars
Cake Wars: Christmas
Carnival Eats
Chef at Home
Chef Dynasty: House of Fang
Clash of the Grandmas
Chopped
Chopped: Canada
Chopped Junior
Cooks vs. Cons
Cupcake Wars
Cutthroat Kitchen
David Rocco's Dolce Vita
Dessert Games
Diners, Drive-ins, and Dives
Donut Showdown

F-J
Fire Masters
Food's Greatest Hits
Food Factory
Food Network Star
Food Network Star Kids
Food Safari
Fresh with Anna Olson
Giada Entertains
Giada in Italy
Ginormous Food
Gordon Ramsay's Seasonal Specials
Great Chocolate Showdown
Great Food Truck Race
The Grill Dads
Guy's Big Bite
Guy's Grocery Games
Guy's Family Road Trip
Holiday Baking Championship
I Hart Food
Inspired with Anna Olson
Iron Chef America
Iron Chef Canada
Junior Chef Showdown
Just One Bite

K-O
Kids Sweet Showdown
Mystery Diners
Neighbourhood Eats

P-T
Patricia Heaton Parties
The Pioneer Woman
Project Bakeover
Restaurant: Impossible
Restaurant Stakeout
Sugar
Sugar Showdown
Top Chef: All-Stars L.A.
Top Chef Canada

U-Z
Valerie's Home Cooking
Vegas Cakes
Wall of Chefs
 Wall of Bakers
Worst Bakers in America
Worst Cooks in America
You Gotta Eat Here!

Past

#-0
The 100 Mile Challenge
24 Hour Restaurant Battle
30 Minute Meals
$40 a Day
5 Ingredient Fix

A-E
Ace of Cakes
Around the World in 80 Plates
Ask Aida
At the Table With...
BBQ with Bobby Flay
Behind the Bash
The Best Thing I Ever Ate
The Best Thing I Ever Made
Big Daddy's House
Buddy's Family Vacation
Calling All Cooks
Canadian Living Cooks
Chef Academy
Chef Abroad
Chef at Home
Chef at Large
CheF*OFF
Chef School
Chefs vs. City
Chef Wild
Chefography
Chocolate with Jacques Torres
Christine Cushing: Cook With Me
Christine Cushing Live
Chuck's Day Off
Cooking for Real
Cook Like a Chef
Cooking Live
Cooking with Me
A Cook's Tour
Crash My Kitchen
Crave
Chef in Your Ear
The Delinquent Gourmet
Dinner: Impossible
Dinner Party Wars
Duff Till Dawn
East Meets West
Easy Entertaining with Michael Chiarello
Eat, Shrink, and Be Merry
Eat St.
Emeril Live
Essence of Emeril
Everyday Exotic
Everyday Italian
Extreme Cuisine with Jeff Corwin

F-J
The F Word
Family Cook Off
The Family Restaurant
Feasting on Asphalt
Fink
Fixing Dinner
Food Fighters
Food 911
Food Fantasy
Food Hunter
Food Jammers
Food Network Challenge
Forever Summer with Nigella
Fresh and Wild
French Food at Home
From Spain With Love with Annie Sibonney
Giada's Weekend Getaways
Good Deal with Dave Lieberman
Good Eats
Gordon Elliott's Door Knock Dinners
Gordon Ramsay's Ultimate Home Cooking
The Great Canadian Cookbook
Great Canadian Food Show
Great Cocktails
Giada at Home
Glutton for Punishment
Ham on the Street
Heat Seekers
The Heat with Mark McEwan
Hell's Kitchen
Honey, We're Killing the Kids
Hot Off the Grill With Bobby Flay
How'd That Get On My Plate?
I Do, Let's Eat
Ice Cold Cash
In Search of Perfection
The Incredible Food Race
The Inn Chef
Iron Chef
Iron Chef America
Jamie's 30-Minute Meals
Jamie at Home
Jamie's Great Italian Escape
Jamie's Kitchen Australia
Just One Bite

K-O
Kid in a Candy Store
Kitchen Crimes
Kitchen Equipped
Kitchen Nightmares
Kylie Kwong: Simply Magic
Licence to Grill
Luau Beach BBQ Challenge
Made to Order
The Main
Man-Made Food
The Manic Organic
Martin Yan's Chinatown
Mexican Made Easy
Molto Mario
Nadia G's Bitchin' Kitchen
New Classics With Chef Rob Feenie
Nigella Bites
Nigella Express
Nigella Feasts
The Opener
Opening Soon
Outrageous Food

P-T
Party Dish
Paula's Best Dishes
Paula's Home Cooking
Pitchin' In
Private Chefs of Beverly Hills
Quick & Easy
Quick Fix Meals with Robin Miller
Rachael Ray's Tasty Travels
Rachael vs. Guy: Celebrity Cook-Off
Rachael vs. Guy: Kids Cook-Off 
Ramsay's Kitchen Nightmares
Recipe for Success
Recipe to Riches
Restaurant Makeover
Restaurant Takeover
Return to Tuscany
Ricardo and Friends
River Cottage Treatment
Road Grill
Road Tasted
Sandwich King
Sara's Secrets
The Secret Life Of...
Secrets of a Restaurant Chef
Shopping With Chefs
Simply Delicioso
Southern at Heart
Spice Goddess
Sugar
Sugar High
Summer's Best
The Supersizers Go...
Surfing the Menu
The Surreal Gourmet
Sweet Baby James
Sweet Genius
Ten Dollar Dinners With Melissa D'Arabian
The Thirsty Traveler
This Food, That Wine
Top 5 Restaurants
Top Chef Just Desserts
Top Chef Masters
Tough Cookies
Two Fat Ladies
Tyler's Ultimate

U-Z
Ultimate Recipe Showdown
 Unwrapped
The Urban Peasant
What Would Brian Boitano Make?
The Wild Chef
Will Work for Food
World's Weirdest Restaurants

See also
 List of programs broadcast by the Food Network

References

Food Network
 
Food- and drink-related lists